Sedition is a law term meaning to inspire insurrection.

It also is used in entertainment:
 Sedition (album), an album by New Zealand Metal band Dawn of Azazel
 Sedition (Jericho episode), an episode from the television show Jericho
 Sedition art, an online platform for artists to display and sell their art in digital format